Thunder River is a tributary of the Peshtigo River in Marinette County, Wisconsin.

The Thunder River originates in northern Oconto County near Thunder Mountain and travels downslope into Marinette County past a waterfall known as Veteran Falls to the Peshtigo River.

References

Rivers of Wisconsin
Rivers of Marinette County, Wisconsin
Rivers of Oconto County, Wisconsin